HCR may refer to:

 Hawaii Consolidated Railway
Herbal Cannabis Reef 
 HCR Corporation, Canadian software company of the 1970s and 1980s
 HCR Manor Care
 Head count ratio
 Health care reform
 Heather Cox Richardson
 Hill Climb Racing, video game
 Hollywood Congress of Republicans
 Holy Cross Airport, in Alaska, United States
 Home Condition Report, a proposed part of the Home Information Pack
 Honey Creek Railroad
 Host-Cell Reactivation
 Hot Chelle Rae, an American pop band
 Hot Club Records
 House concurrent resolution, in the United States Congress
 Household Cavalry Regiment, in the British Army
 Hover Car Racer
 Human cognitive reliability correlation
 Huntingdon Community Radio
 United Nations High Commissioner for Refugees
 UTRA-TDD HCR, a telecommunication standard